The Man Who Knew is a 1918 British thriller novel by Edgar Wallace. A detective investigates the death of a South Africa diamond magnate in London.

Adaptation
In 1961 it was turned into the film Partners in Crime, directed by Peter Duffell as part of a long-running series of Wallace films made at Merton Park Studios.

References

Bibliography
 Goble, Alan. The Complete Index to Literary Sources in Film. Walter de Gruyter, 1999.

1918 British novels
Novels by Edgar Wallace
British thriller novels
British novels adapted into films
Novels set in London